() is a pure holding company with the Mitsukoshi and Isetan department stores as its wholly owned subsidiaries.

Operations

In August 2007, Isetan Co. Ltd. and Mitsukoshi Ltd. announced that the two companies "have agreed to merge and form a new holding company" in April 2008.

On 9 January 2010, Nobukazu Muto (b. 1945), the company's chairman and chief executive officer died.

As of 2012, Hiroshi Onishi was the president and chief executive officer of Isetan Mitsukoshi Holding.

On 26 July 2013, the company announced that, in the first quarter of 2013, it net profits increased by 11.4 percent due to increased sales and lower expenses.

References

External links
 Isetan Mitsukoshi Holdings 

Retail companies based in Tokyo
Companies listed on the Tokyo Stock Exchange
Holding companies based in Tokyo
Mitsui
Japanese companies established in 2008
Retail companies established in 2008
Holding companies established in 2008